MSR may refer to:

Science and technology
 Macrophage scavenger receptor, a receptor found in macrophages
 Magnetic stripe reader, a device used to read magnetic stripe cards such as credit cards
 M–sigma relation, in astrophysics
 Mars sample return mission, a spaceflight mission to return rock and dust samples collected on Mars
 Mirror self-recognition, in animals through the mirror test
 Molten salt reactor, an advanced nuclear reactor design

Computing
 Machine state register, a register used in PowerPC architectures
 Model-specific register, a feature in x86 processors
 Microsoft Reserved Partition, a space-management partition on a computer storage device
 Mining software repositories, a field that analyzes the rich data available in software repositories

Entertainment
 MSR Studios, a New York recording studio 
 The Most Serene Republic, a Canadian indie rock band 
 Metropolis Street Racer, a Dreamcast racing game
 Mid-season replacement, a television series that premieres in the second half of a traditional season
Metroid: Samus Returns, a video game
 Mulder Scully Romance, the relationship of the main characters of the television series The X-Files

Organizations and companies
 Market Street Railway (nonprofit), a historic preservation organization in San Francisco, California, U.S.
 Microsoft Research, the research division of Microsoft
 Mountain Safety Research, a US company specializing in outdoor equipment 
 Mouvement social révolutionnaire, the French fascist party Revolutionary Social Movement
 Movimiento Social Republicano, the Republican Social Movement political party in Spain
 MSR - The Israel Center for Medical Simulation, Israeli institute for Simulation-Based Medical Education

Places
 Most Serene Republic, a title in the name of various countries
 Montserrat (ISO 3166-1 code)

Transportation
 EgyptAir (ICAO designator), an Egyptian airline
 Main supply route, a military operations supply route
 Market Street Railway (transit operator), a defunct company in California, U.S.
 Maserati, a luxury sports car company
 Michigan Shore Railroad, US
 Muar State Railway, a defunct railway formerly operating in the Johor Sultanate, British Malaya
 Mumbai Suburban Railway, India
 Muş Airport (IATA airport code), Turkey

Weapons
 Modern sporting rifle or AR-15 style rifle
 Modular Sniper Rifle, a sniper rifle produced by Remington Arms
 Magnum Sniper Rifle or Accuracy International Arctic Warfare, a bolt-action sniper rifle

Other uses

 Market Stability Reserve, a part of the European Union Emission Trading Scheme
 Milan–San Remo, an annual bicycle race
 Mortgage servicing rights, the rights to collect mortgage payments from a borrower for the benefit of the lender
 Meyer Shank Racing, an American auto racing team